Nicole Gordon (born 17 March 1976 in Lower Hutt, New Zealand) is a badminton player from New Zealand. At the 2002 Commonwealth Games she won a silver medal with Sara Petersen in women's doubles, and a bronze medal in the mixed team event.

References

1976 births
Living people
New Zealand female badminton players
Commonwealth Games silver medallists for New Zealand
Commonwealth Games bronze medallists for New Zealand
Badminton players at the 1998 Commonwealth Games
Badminton players at the 2002 Commonwealth Games
Badminton players at the 2006 Commonwealth Games
Sportspeople from Lower Hutt
Commonwealth Games medallists in badminton
Medallists at the 2002 Commonwealth Games